The 1973 2. divisjon was a Norwegian second-tier football league season.

The league was contested by 36 teams, divided into a total of four groups; A and B (non-Northern Norwegian teams) and two district groups which contained teams from Northern Norway: district IX–X and district XI. The winners of group A and B were promoted to the 1974 1. divisjon, while the winners of the district groups qualified for the Northern Norwegian final. The second placed teams in group A and B met the winner of the district IX–X in a qualification round where the winner was promoted to 1. divisjon. The winner of district XI was not eligible for promotion. The bottom two teams inn all groups were relegated to the 3. divisjon.

Overview

Summary
Sarpsborg FK won group A. Molde won group B with two matches to spare. Both teams promoted to the 1974 1. divisjon. Vålerengen won the qualification play-offs and was also promoted.

Tables

Group A

Group B

District IX–X

District XI

Promotion play-offs

Results
Vålerengen – Mjølner 2–0
Mjølner – Bryne 0–0
Bryne – Vålerengen 0–1

Vålerengen won the qualification round and won promotion to the 1. divisjon.

Play-off table

Northern Norwegian Final
A Northern Norwegian Final was played between the winners of the two district groups, Mjølner and Kirkenes. 

Kirkenes – Mjølner 0–1

References

Norwegian First Division seasons
1973 in Norwegian football
Norway
Norway